This is a categorized list of physics mnemonics.

Mechanics

Work: formula

"Lots of Work makes me Mad!":

Work = Mad:

M=Mass

a=acceleration

d=distance

Thermodynamics

Ideal gas law

"Pure Virgins Never Really Tire":

PV=nRT

Gibbs's free energy formula
"Good Honey Tastes Sweet":

(delta)G = H - T(delta)S.

Electrodynamics

Ohm's Law

"Virgins Are Rare":

Volts = Amps x Resistance

Relation between Resistance and Resistivity 
REPLAY

Resistance = ρ (Length/Area)

Inductive and Capacitive circuits
Once upon a time, the symbol E (for electromotive force) was used to designate voltages. Then, every student learned the phrase 
ELI the ICE man
as a reminder that:

For an inductive (L) circuit, the EMF (E) is ahead of the current (I)
 While for a capactive circuit (C), the current (I) is ahead of the EMF (E).

And then they all lived happily ever after.

Open and Short circuits
"There are zero COVS grazing in the field!"

This is a mnemonic to remember the useful fact that:
 The Current through an Open circuit is always zero
 The Voltage across a Short circuit is always zero

Order of rainbow colors

ROYGBIV (in reverse VIBGYOR) is commonly used to remember the order of colors in the visible light spectrum, as seen in a rainbow.

Richard of York gave battle in vain"
(red, orange, yellow, green, blue, indigo, violet).

Additionally, the fictitious name Roy G. Biv can be used as well.
(red, orange, yellow, green, blue, indigo, violet).

Speed of light
The phrase "We guarantee certainty, clearly referring to this light mnemonic." represents the speed of light in meters per second through the number of letters in each word: 299,792,458.

Electromagnetic spectrum
In the order of increasing frequency or decreasing wavelength of electromagnetic waves;

 Road Men Invented Very Unique Xtra Gums 
Ronald McDonald Invented Very Unusual & eXcellent Gherkins.
Remember My Instructions Visible Under X-Ray Glasses
Raging (or Red) Martians Invaded Venus Using X-ray Guns.Rahul's Mother Is Visiting Uncle Xavier's Garden.Ryann May I Visit YoUr eX-Girlfriend?Rich Men In Vegas Use eXpensive GadgetsRoyal Magicians Interested Viewing Untied X-mas GiftsIn the order of increasing wavelength;Good Xylophones Use Very Interesting Musical Rhythms.Godzilla-X Using Violence In Meeting Room.Granddad Xavier Unfortunately Vomited In My Room.Grandma's X-Large Underwear Visible In My Room.

Microwave frequency bands

Microwave frequency bands ordered by increasing wavelengths (decreasing frequencies):
King Xerxes Can Seduce Lovely (princesses)

Other

Radium series (or uranium series) 
To remember the decay chain of 238U, commonly called the "radium series" (sometimes "uranium series"). Beginning with naturally occurring uranium-238;

A Bitty Bitty Ant Asked Another Ant About Bitty Bitty Ants' Bitty Bitty Aunts

A = alpha decay

B = beta decay

See also
List of electronic color code mnemonics
List of chemistry mnemonics

References

Mnemonics
Mnemonics
Mnemonics